Rupert Chandos Daniels (born 28 June 1945) is an English former first-class cricketer.

Daniels was born at Edgbaston in June 1945. He was educated at Eton College, before going up to Trinity College, Oxford. While studying at Oxford, he played first-class cricket for Oxford University in 1965 and 1966, making seven appearances against county opposition, though never featuring in The University Match. He scored 97 runs in his seven matches, with a high score of 26, in addition to taking a single wicket with his off break bowling.

References

External links

1945 births
Living people
People from Edgbaston
People educated at Eton College
Alumni of Trinity College, Oxford
English cricketers
Oxford University cricketers